Edmund Warwick (15 July 1907 – 21 December 1989) was a British actor who appeared in various television programmes.

Some of his credits included The Adventures of Robin Hood, Z-Cars and Doctor Who.

In the last of those Warwick portrayed the character of Darrius in The Keys of Marinus, doubled for William Hartnell as the First Doctor in The Dalek Invasion of Earth after the lead actor was injured during filming, and played a robot double of Hartnell's Doctor in The Chase - this duplicate having been created by the Daleks.

References

External links

1907 births
1989 deaths
English male television actors
Male actors from London
20th-century British male actors